Abdullah Al-Shamsi (born 25 November 1967) is a former wrestler, who represented North Yemen at the 1988 Summer Olympic Games in the men's Greco-Roman 68kg class. He lost his first two bouts and was eliminated.

References

External links
 

Wrestlers at the 1988 Summer Olympics
Yemeni male sport wrestlers
Olympic wrestlers of North Yemen
1967 births
Living people